Brachypeza bisignata is a Palearctic species of  'fungus gnat' in the family Mycetophilidae. 
Reared from puffballs (Lycoperdales).

References

External links
 Images representing  Brachypeza at BOLD

Mycetophilidae
Insects described in 1863
Nematoceran flies of Europe